Eros Maddy (born 5 February 2001) is a Dutch professional footballer who plays as a right winger for Eerste Divisie club Helmond Sport.

Club career
He made his Eerste Divisie debut for Jong Ajax on 20 November 2018 in a game against Jong FC Utrecht as a 60th minute substitute for Sebastian Pasquali.

On 13 July 2022, Maddy signed a two-year contract with an option for an additional season with Helmond Sport. He made his competitive debut for the club on 5 August, the opening matchday of the 2022–23 Eerste Divisie season, replacing Peter van Ooijen in the 74th minute of a 1–0 away loss.

Personal life
Born in the Netherlands, Maddy is of Surinamese descent.

References

External links
 
 Career stats & Profile - Voetbal International

2001 births
Living people
People from Woerden
Dutch sportspeople of Surinamese descent
Dutch footballers
Netherlands youth international footballers
Association football wingers
Jong Ajax players
Jong FC Utrecht players
FC Utrecht players
Helmond Sport players
Eerste Divisie players
Footballers from Utrecht (province)